Jesko Raffin (born 12 June 1996) is a Swiss motorcycle racer. He was the FIM CEV Moto2 champion in 2014 and 2018.

Career

After winning the CEV Moto2 Championship in 2014, in  Raffin was back to the Moto2 World Championship as a full-time rider, competing with a Kalex for the Sports-Millions–Emwe–SAG team. He failed to score championship points, as his best result was 17th place, obtained in third occasions—Indianapolis, Motegi and Phillip Island. He achieved his first Grand Prix points at Jerez with a 14th place and a best result of 8th at Sachsenring.

In , Raffin switched to the Garage Plus Interwetten team from his home country Switzerland. He collected 26 points and finished 20th in the standings. Raffin did not find a ride for the  season, but was recalled by his former SAG team as a replacement rider for six of the final seven races after Isaac Viñales parted ways with the team prematurely. In six races, Raffin achieved 10 points and 22nd in the standings. In the same year he won the FIM CEV Moto2 European Championship.

In , Raffin joined the inaugural MotoE World Cup with the German Dynavolt Intact GP team. He collected 47 points and finished the season in 8th. Raffin also had eight replacement rider entries in the Moto2 season, one with the Intact GP team and seven with RW Racing GP.

Career statistics

FIM CEV Moto2 European Championship

Races by year
(key) (Races in bold indicate pole position, races in italics indicate fastest lap)

Grand Prix motorcycle racing

By season

By class

Races by year
(key) (Races in bold indicate pole position, races in italics indicate fastest lap)

References

External links

 

1996 births
Living people
Swiss motorcycle racers
Moto2 World Championship riders
Sportspeople from Zürich
MotoE World Cup riders